The 1951 Princeton Tigers football team represented Princeton University in the 1951 college football season. Led by seventh-year head coach Charlie Caldwell, the team played its home games on campus at Palmer Stadium in Princeton, New Jersey. The independent Tigers won all nine games and were considered the best team in the East, winning the Lambert-Meadowlands Trophy, and finished sixth in both major polls.

Senior back Dick Kazmaier was a consensus All-American and won the Heisman Trophy by a wide margin; he was the nation's total offense leader and most accurate passer.

Schedule

Awards and honors
 Dick Kazmaier: Heisman Trophy, Maxwell Award, consensus All-American

NFL Draft
Two Tigers were selected in the 1952 NFL Draft, held on January 17.

References

Princeton
Princeton Tigers football seasons
Lambert-Meadowlands Trophy seasons
College football undefeated seasons
Princeton Tigers football